Laing is a Scottish surname, commonly found in countries settled by Scots, such as Canada and New Zealand. It is often wrongly described  as a descriptive surname, cognate with the English surname [Long (Scots lang) but this is a mispronounciation of the name, which is pronounced layng. The name eminates from Normandy. 

Notable people with the surname include:

Alex Laing (footballer), New Zealand footballer
Alexander Laing (architect), Scottish architect
Alexander Gordon Laing (1794–1826), Scottish explorer
Andrew Laing (born 1966), New Zealand actor
Annie Rose Laing (1869–1946), Scottish artist
Arthur Laing (1904–1975), Canadian politician
Bert Laing, New Zealand rugby league footballer
Billy Laing (born 1951), Scottish footballer
Bobby Laing (1925–1985), Scottish footballer
Bonnie Laing (1937–2016), Canadian politician
Brent Laing (born 1978), Canadian curler
Catriona Laing, British ambassador
Corky Laing (Laurence Gordon Laing, born 1948), Canadian musician
C. J. Laing (born 1956), American pornographic actress
Shanae laing (born 2008),

Dan Laing, American sports commentator
Dave Laing (born 1947), English music journalist
David Laing (architect) (1774–1856), British architect of the New Custom House, London
David Laing (antiquary) (1793–1878), Scottish antiquary
Davie Laing (1925–2017), Scottish footballer
Dilys Laing (1906–1960), Welsh-American poet
Duncan Laing (1933–2008), New Zealand swimming coach
Ebenezer Laing (1931–2015), Ghanaian botanist and geneticist
Eleanor Laing (born 1958), British politician
Gerald Laing (1936–2011), Scottish artist
Gordon Laing (born 1964), British classical bassoonist
Gordon Jennings Laing (1869–1945), Canadian-American academic
Hector Laing, Baron Laing of Dunphail (1923–2010), British businessman
Hugh Laing (1911–1988), British ballet dancer
Ivan Laing (1885–1917), Scottish hockey player
James Laing (doctor) ( 1749–1831), Scottish medical man and plantation owner in Dominica
James Laing (born 1982), British entrepreneur
Jamie Laing (born 1988), English television personality
John Laing (disambiguation), several people
Kerri Laing (born 1968), South African cricketer
Kirby Laing (1916–2009), English businessman
Kirkland Laing (1954–2021), Jamaican-English boxer
Kojo Laing (1946–2017), Ghanaian novelist and poet
Lavinia Malcolm née Laing ( 1847–1920), Scottish suffragist, politician, first Scottish woman female councillor and first female Lord Provost
Leslie Laing (born 1925), Jamaican athlete
Malcolm Laing (1762–1818), Scottish historian
Marie Laing (born 1937), Canadian politician
Martin Laing (born 1942), English businessman
Martin Laing (production designer), British film production designer
Maureen Laing (1920–2013), American journalist and author
Maurice Laing (1918–2008), English businessman
Michael Laing, South African chemist
Quintin Laing (born 1979), Canadian ice hockey player
Robbie Laing (born 1958), American basketball coach
Robert W. Laing, British film art director
Ronald David Laing (1927–1989), Scottish psychiatrist
Roy Laing (1893–1972), Australian rules footballer
Samuel Laing (travel writer) (1780–1868), author of books on Scandinavia and Germany
Samuel Laing (science writer) (1812–1897), British railway administrator, politician, and writer on science and religion
Sandra Laing (born 1955), South African apartheid cause célèbre
Shona Laing (born 1955), New Zealand musician
Stuart Laing (diplomat) (born 1948), British diplomat
Stuart Laing (actor) (born 1969), British actor
Tony Laing (boxer) (born 1957), Jamaican-British boxer
William Laing (disambiguation), several people

See also
Laing (disambiguation)
Laing family
Lang (surname)
Lange (surname)

Scottish surnames